Elie Apper (born 1933) is a Belgian classical saxophonist who is well known as a former member of the Saxophone Quartet of Belgium ("Le Quatuor Belge de Saxophones").  The quartet was founded in 1953 and made its American debut December 9, 1970, in Fort Worth with the Youth Orchestra of Greater Fort Worth.  The Quartet was founded by Francois Daneels, who was a professor of saxophone at the Brussels Conservatory.

Career 
From 1972 to 1974, Apper served as visiting lecturer at the University of North Texas College of Music.  He also was once a faculty member of the Flemish Conservatory and a soloist with the Flemish Radio and Television Orchestra and the Royal Band of the Belgian Guides.

Saxophone Quartet members in 1970 
 François Daneels (1921–2010), soprano saxophone
 Alfred Jacquet, alto saxophone
 Elie Apper, tenor saxophone
 Jean Cunche, baritone saxophone

Higher education 
Apper, a student of Francois Daneels at the Royal Conservatory of Brussels, gained First Prize and was appointed Professor of Saxophone (Flemish section).

Selected discography 

 Saxo-Rama, featuring Elie Apper, alto sax, Zéphyr Records Z-08 (LP) (1980); ; 
 Recorded at Studio Steurbaut, Ghent, Belgium (Gilbert Steurbaut)
 Produced by Schott frères
 Side A
 Concerto N° 1 for Alto Saxophone (1902), by Paul Gilson (1865–1942), Elie Apper; Royal Guides Band, conductor
 Divertimento N° 12 for 2 Saxophones, by Paul Arma (1905–1987), Elie Apper and Norbert Nozy, saxophonists
 Side B
Parades II For Saxophone Sextet, (1978), by Victor Legley (1915–1994), Saxofonia Ensemble
 Sextet:  Norbert Nozy (soprano saxophone), Elie Apper (alto saxophone), Rita Van der Meirsch (alto saxophone), Freddy Couché (tenor saxophone), Jozef Lauwers (tenor saxophone), Frank Commeene (baritone saxophone)

 Saxophonia, Europ Records (1977), 
 Elie Apper and Norbert Nozy, saxophones; Helene Luyten, piano and organ; Brussels Youth Orchestra; Hendrik Rycken (1928–2003), conductor; 
 Recorded at the Brussels Academy, November 1975 and July 1976
 Concerto, by Alexander Glazunov (1865–1936)
 Adagio, by Tomaso Albinoni (1671–1751)
 Facetten,  (1923–2000)
 "Beau Soir" (1877/78), by Claude Debussy (1862–1918)
 "A pas de loup," Pierre Max Dubois (1930–1995)
 La fille aux cheveux de lin (1909/10), by Claude Debussy (1862–1918)

 Hommage à de grands musiciens belges, Palette Records (1976); 
 Royal Guides Band, conductor
 Elie Apper, alto saxophone (on the 3rd piece)
Hommage à Sax: diptyque concertant pour saxophone alto et orchestre de chambre (Éditions Alphonse Leduc, 1958), by René Bernier (1905–1984)

 Divertimento for Saxophone Quartet and Orchestra (1965), by Jean Absil (1893–1974), Decca 173428 (LP); 
 National Orchestra of Belgium, Daniel Sternefeld, conductor
 François Daneels, soprano saxophone; Clovis Liénard, alto saxophone; Elie Apper, tenor saxophone; Jean Cunche, baritone saxophone

 Récital de clarinette; Récital de saxophone; Quatuor Belge de Saxophones, Alpha DB-94 (LP) (1973); 
 Pierre de Leye, clarinet, Renée Stoefs, piano (in works 1-3); Cappelle Claudine, piano (in works 4-5)
 Belgium Saxophone Quartet (in the last work): : François Daneels, soprano saxophone; Clovis Liénard, alto saxophone; Elie Apper, tenor saxophone; Jean Cunche, baritone saxophone
Impressions de Cinema, by Léon Stekke (fr) (1904–1970)
 Reverdies by René Bernier (1905–1984)
 "Polonaise" Op. 74, by Carl Maria von Weber
Intro & Dance,  (1927–2008)
Andante & Fileuse, Pierre Petit, saxophone & piano
4 Sequences for 4 Saxophones, by Franz Constant

 François Daneels Saxophone Recital, Buffet Crampon Records BCB 105 (1973); 
 François Daneels, alto saxophone; Claudine Capelle, piano
 Belgium Saxophone Quartet (in the last work): : François Daneels, soprano saxophone; Alfred Jacquet, alto saxophone; Elie Apper, tenor saxophone; Jean Cunche, baritone saxophone
 Side A
 Fantaisie Caprice, for saxophone and piano, by Jean Absil (1893–1974)
 Sisyphus (1971), for saxophone and piano, William Peters Latham
 Variations, for saxophone quartet, Pierre Max Dubois

 Selected performances 
 World Saxophone Congress II, 1970, Chicago
 Suite on Romanian Themes, Op. 90 (1956), by Jean Absil (1893–1974)
 Belgium Saxophone Quartet: François Daneels (1921–2010), soprano saxophone; Alfred Jacquet, alto saxophone; Elie Apper, tenor saxophone; Jean Cunche, baritone saxophone

 BBC Radio 3, 10 March 1975, 11 AM
 Belgium Saxophone Quartet: François Daneels (1921–2010), soprano saxophone; Alfred Jacquet, alto saxophone; Elie Apper, tenor saxophone; Jean Cunche, baritone saxophone
 Works by Claude Pascal, Jean Absil, and Jean Françaix

 Selected publications 
 "The European International Saxophone Symposiums," by Elie Apper, The Saxophone Symposium'' (journal of the North American Saxophone Alliance), Vol. 5, No. 2, Spring 1980; pps. 18–19; 
 Elie Apper writes on his experiences and the history of the International Saxophone Symposium

References 

Classical saxophonists
Belgian classical musicians
Living people
University of North Texas College of Music faculty
1933 births
Place of birth missing (living people)
Royal Conservatory of Brussels alumni
Academic staff of the Royal Conservatory of Brussels
21st-century saxophonists
Belgian military musicians